Maggie Thompson (born Margaret Curtis; November 29, 1942), is an American longtime editor of the now-defunct comic book industry news magazine Comics Buyer's Guide, science fiction fan, and collector of comics.

Early life 
Margaret (nickname, "Maggie") Curtis was born November 29, 1942. Her mother, science fiction writer Betsy Curtis, would be nominated for the Hugo Award for Best Short Story in 1969 for her story "The Steiger Effect"; she carried on a long correspondence with colleagues such as Robert Heinlein and L. Ron Hubbard. According to family tradition, Betsy claimed descent from Anne Bradstreet and at least two presidents of Yale University.

Thompson and her late husband and fellow science fiction fan Don Thompson (October 30, 1935 – May 23, 1994) were among the instigators of what developed in the 1960s into comic book fandom.

Their Harbinger (a mimeographed one-sheet published in the autumn of 1960) announced the upcoming publication of Comic Art, one of the early amateur magazines devoted to all aspects of sequential art (a term not then in use). The initial issue of Comic Art was released the following spring. Seven issues were published at irregular intervals between 1961 and 1968. As publication of Comic Art wound down, they shifted their attention to a new venture as the Thompsons started a fanzine titled Newfangles in March 1967. Unlike other comics news fanzines of the time it was devoted to the doings of comics fandom instead of news about comic books and comic book professionals.

Career

Thompson began working for Krause Publications as the editor of Movie Collector's World and Comics Buyer's Guide in 1983. That same year she created and edited Fantasy Empire magazine and wrote Dark Shadows: Book Two #1-4 for Innovation Comics. With her husband Don, she wrote a miscellany of articles and comic-book stories; The Official Price Guide to Science Fiction and Fantasy (1989, House of Collectibles); five years of Comics Buyer's Guide Annual (1992–1996, Krause Publications); Marvel Comics Checklist & Price Guide 1961-Present (1993, Krause Publications); and Comic-Book Superstars (1993, Krause Publications). With others, she produced the Comics Buyer's Guide Checklist & Price Guide (now in its 15th edition, Krause Publications); and the Standard Catalog of Comic Books (now in its 5th edition, Krause Publications).

Krause later sold the movie newspaper, but Thompson continued to edit Comics Buyer's Guide, long after her husband's death in 1994 and the transformation of the publication into a monthly magazine. In 2013 she began a column for San Diego Comic-Con International's Toucan blog called "Maggie's World".

Her son Stephen Thompson would go on to become an editor for The Onion and creator of The A.V. Club before moving on to NPR. Stephen co-hosts "Pop Culture Happy Hour", a pop culture-themed podcast on which Maggie has made multiple appearances.

Accolades 
Under Maggie's editorial direction, Comics Buyer's Guide twice won the comics industry's Eisner Award for periodicals, among other awards. She was a recipient of the Bob Clampett Humanitarian Award and was also the first recipient of the Friends of Lulu's "Women of Distinction" Award.

Maggie and Don Thompson received many joint awards, including:
 Comic Fan Art Award Favorite Fan Writer, 1973 & 1974
 Inkpot Award, 1976
 Jack Kirby Award, Best Comics Publication, 1985
 Diamond Lifetime Fandom Award, 1991
 Eisner Award, Best Comics-Related Periodical, 1992
 Harvey Award, Comics Industry Pioneer Award, 2019
 Eisner Award, Hall of Fame, 2020

Thompson Award 
The Motor City Comic Con awarded the Don Thompson Award from 1992 to 1998. Originally known as the "Compuserve Comics and Animation Forum Award", the name was changed to the "Compuserve Comics and Animation Forum's Don Thompson Award" (or, simply, the "Thompson") after Don Thompson's death in 1994.

References

External links

 Maggie Thompson official site
 Maggie's World (column for Comic Con's Toucan blog) 
 Comics Buyer’s Guide
 Harbinger online reprint
 Comic Art #1 online reprint
 Newfangles online collection

1942 births
Living people
American print editors
Comics critics
Oberlin College alumni
Female comics writers
Bob Clampett Humanitarian Award winners
American librarians
American women librarians
Women print editors
Harvey Award winners